Mustafa Kizza (born 3 October 1999) is a Ugandan footballer who plays for the Uganda national team as left back.

Club career

KCCA FC
On 24 February 2017, Kizza was unveiled at Kampala Capital City Authority's ground, Lugogo. Kizza made his senior debut for Kampala Capital City Authority against Bright Stars FC at Phillip Omondi stadium on 3 March 2017. He scored his first goal for Kampala Capital City Authority against Police FC on 15 November 2017 at Phillip Omondi Stadium Lugogo. He appeared in 7 matches for Kampala Capital City Authority.

Kizza played his first game of the season against Bright Stars FC at Phillip Omondi StarTimes Stadium, Kampala Capital City Authority (won 2–1). He scored his first goal of the season against Police FC from Phillip Omondi Stadium Lugoggo.
He played 23 matches in the season. Kampala Capital City Authority won the league. Kizza completed the 2018–2019 Uganda Premier League season with 25 assists in that season; 16 in Uganda Premier League, 6 in Caf, 4 Uganda Cup and scored 2 goals in the season.

Kizza played his first game in that season against Maroons FC, he played 24 Uganda Premier League games making 14 Assists; 2 assists in Caf, and scoring 6 goals.

Kizza played his first game of the season against Wakiso Giants FC on 31 August 2019 and scored in that game, Kampala Capital City Authority won 1–0.

CF Montréal
In July 2020, he signed for Montreal Impact (which became known as CF Montréal in 2021). Following the 2021 season, Kizza's contract option was declined by Montréal.

Arouca
In July 2022, he signed for a Portuguese Club  F.C. Arouca which plays in the top division Primeira Liga.   He was given a 3 year contract.

International career

Uganda U20
Kizza played for Uganda U20 during the 2017 COSAFA U-20 Cup in Zambia. He made his debut on 6 December 2017 against Zambia U20 at Arthur Davis Stadium, Kitwe.

Uganda U23
Kizza has played for Uganda U23 during the AFCON U-23 Qualifiers. He made his debut on 14 November 2018 against South Sudan U23 at Star Times Stadium Lugogo; Uganda U23 won the game 1–0 which was scored by Kizza.

Uganda national football team
He made his senior national team debut on 1 June 2019 against Lesotho during the 2019 COSAFA Cup.

Career statistics

International goals
Scores and results Uganda's goal tally first.

Honors

KCCA FC
Uganda Premier League :2 : 2016–2017, 2018–2019 
Uganda Cup : 2016–2017, 2017–2018
CECAFA Clubs Cup: 1; 2019

Individual Honors
 Young Player of the Year : 2016–2017
 Airtel FUFA Best eleven 2017–2018,

Notes

References

External links
 
 
 Mustafa KIZZA

1999 births
People from Kampala District
Living people
Ugandan footballers
Uganda under-20 international footballers
Uganda international footballers
Association football midfielders
Kampala Capital City Authority FC players
CF Montréal players
F.C. Arouca players
Major League Soccer players
Ugandan expatriate footballers
Expatriate soccer players in Canada
Ugandan expatriate sportspeople in Canada
Expatriate footballers in Portugal
Ugandan expatriate sportspeople in Portugal